The 2012 Zohan earthquake occurred on December 5 at  with a moment magnitude of 5.8 and a maximum perceived intensity of VII (Very strong) on the Mercalli intensity scale. The shock occurred near the city of Zohan, Qayen and Birjand in South Khorasan Province, Iran. It struck 42 km ESE from Qayen. At least 8 people were killed and 23 people were injured.

See also 
List of earthquakes in 2012
List of earthquakes in Iran

References

External links

2012 earthquakes
Earthquakes in Iran
2012 in Iran
December 2012 events in Iran
2012 disasters in Iran